Fischer is a surname.

It may also refer to:
 Fischer (company), an Austrian company that produces Nordic skiing, alpine skiing, tennis and hockey equipment
 Fischer, Behar, Chen, Well, Orion & Co., a law firm in Israel
 Fischer catalog, listing of postage stamps relating to Poland
 Fischer's lovebird (Agapornis fischeri), small parrot species
 Fischer Brewery, an Alsatian brewery
 Fischer Motor Company, a U.S. motorcycle manufacturer
 Fischerspooner, a New York based electronica band
 Fischer-Z, British rock band
 Fischer, Texas, U.S.
 Fischer Racing, a German auto racing team
 Koss, Michigan, formerly named Fischer
 S. Fischer Verlag, a German publishing house
 Fischerwerke, a German construction fixings manufacturer
 Fischer, South Australia, a locality in the Mid North between Gawler and Mallala
 Fischer (crater), a lunar impact crater in the walled plain Mendeleev

See also 
 
 Fisher (disambiguation)